Iran participated in the 2003 Asian Winter Games held in Aomori, Japan from January 1, 2003 to February 8, 2003.

Competitors

Results by event

Skiing

Alpine

Men

Cross-country

Men

Snowboarding

Men

References

External links
 Official Website of the 5th Winter Asian Games

Asian Winter Games
Nations at the 2003 Asian Winter Games
2003